The Ministry of Energy is the national Ministry of Energy of Mauritania, located in Nouakchott. It is located on the corner of Avenue Gamal Abdel Nasser and the Nouadhibou Highway, near the Grand National Hospital of Mauritania.

References

Government of Mauritania
Nouakchott